The 1989 Jacksonville State Gamecocks football team represented Jacksonville State University as a member of the Gulf South Conference (GSC) during the 1989 NCAA Division II football season. Led by fifth-year head coach Bill Burgess, the Gamecocks compiled an overall record of 13–1 with a mark of 8–0 in conference play, winning the GSC title. In 1993, the NCAA vacated Mississippi College's championship as a result of numerous violations, but the Gamecocks are still recognized as runner-up.

Schedule

References

Jacksonville State
Jacksonville State Gamecocks football seasons
Gulf South Conference football champion seasons
Jacksonville State Gamecocks football